Welcome to the Woods is the third studio album by the American country music band The Lost Trailers, released on Universal South/Republic Records on April 20, 2004. The album produced one single, "Down in the Valley", written by Scott Claassen and Ross Flournoy that failed to enter the Hot Country Songs chart.

Track listing
All songs written by Stokes Nielson, unless noted otherwise.

Personnel
As listed in liner notes.

The Lost Trailers
Ryder Lee - piano, Hammond organ, background vocals
Manny Medina - acoustic guitar, background vocals
Andrew Nielson - bass guitar, background vocals
Stokes Nielson - electric guitar, lead vocals
Jeff Potter - drums, background vocals

Additional musicians
 Denny Fongheiser - drums
 Dave Francis - bass guitar
 Mickey Raphael - harmonica on "Yellow Rose"
 Stacey Williams - background vocals on "Averly Jane", "The Battery" and "West End"
 The Section Quartet - strings on "Atlanta" and "Sitting on Top of the World"
 Daphne Chen - violin
 Richard Dodd - cello
 Eric Gorfain - violin
 Leah Katz - viola

References

2004 albums
Republic Records albums
Universal Records albums
The Lost Trailers albums